Giuseppe Garibaldi was an Italian  light cruiser, that served in the Regia Marina during World War II. After the war she was retained by the Marina Militare and upgraded. She was built by CRDA, in Stabilimento Tecnico Triestino shipyard Trieste and named after the Italian general Giuseppe Garibaldi.

Decommissioned in 1953, Giuseppe Garibaldi was converted between 1957 and 1961, at the La Spezia shipyards, into a guided missile cruiser.

Design
The armament was also increased by two extra 152 mm guns, triple turrets replaced twins in the "A" and "Y" positions. The machinery was also revised which led to these ships having a slightly slower maximum speed than their predecessors.

World War II service

1940
On 9 July at the Battle of Calabria, Giuseppe Garibaldi along with her sister, fired the first rounds of the engagement. During the engagement, splinters from a 6-inch round fired by Giuseppe Garibaldi hit the British cruiser , damaging her catapult and the reconnaissance aircraft beyond repair.

On 1 September, she was part of the fleet that attempted to intercept the Hats convoy and on 29 September, Giuseppe Garibaldi and the rest of the Italian fleet made another ineffectual sortie against Operation MB 5, a successful British attempt to ressuply Malta. On 11 November, Giuseppe Garibaldi was anchored at Taranto when  British aircraft attacked the Italian fleet in the harbour.

1941
On 27 March, Giuseppe Garibaldi participated in the Battle of Cape Matapan. The commander of the ship at the time was Captain Stanislao Caraciotti. On 8 May she was part of an Italian force that failed to intercept Tiger convoy. On 28 July the cruiser was torpedoed and damaged by the British submarine .

1942
On 3 January, the cruiser escorted Italian convoy M 43. On 7 March, Giuseppe Garibaldi took part in Operation V 5, escorting a large Axis convoy to Libya along with fellow Condottieri-class cruiser, . On 14 June Giuseppe Garibaldi participated in the successful action against convoy Vigorous, an attempt to resupply Malta by the Royal Navy.

After the armistice (8 September 1943), she operated in the South Atlantic together with Allied ships against potential German raiders.

As a guided missile cruiser

After the war she was retained by the Italian Navy and modernized with minor changes of the armament and a radar. She was decommissioned in 1953 and reconstructed as a guided missile cruiser.

The new ship was rebuilt in the La Spezia Arsenal starting from 1957, and, at her completion in 1961, she was named flagship of the Italian Navy. The reconstruction included a complete overhauling of the superstructure, while the hull kept its original dimensions. Apart from some minor changes, much of the latter's rebuilding included four launchers for the U.S. designed UGM-27 Polaris nuclear ballistic missiles. The US never provided the missiles. Instead the Italian government set to develop an indigenous missile, called Alfa. The propulsion system remained the same. The rest of the armament was radically altered: a RIM-2 Terrier missile launcher made Giuseppe Garibaldi the first missile cruiser in Europe. The previous artillery was replaced by four 135 mm/45 guns in two twin turrets and eight Oto Melara 76 mm/62 Type MMI AA guns. Electronics included several radars and fire control systems.

She was decommissioned in 1971 and scrapped the following year.

Notes

References

 
 

 Gardiner, Robert; Chumbley, Stephen & Budzbon, Przemysław (1995). Conway's All the World's Fighting Ships 1947-1995. Annapolis, Maryland: Naval Institute Press. .

External links
Giuseppe Garibaldi (551) Marina Militare website

Duca degli Abruzzi-class cruisers
Ships built in Trieste
1936 ships
World War II cruisers of Italy
Cold War cruisers of Italy
Ships built by Cantieri Riuniti dell'Adriatico